An Hour to Kill is a 2018 comedy horror anthology film, directed by Aaron K. Carter. It stars Mel Novak, Aaron Guerrero and Frankie Pozos.
The film was released on Amazon Prime on October 22, 2018.

Premise
Two hired killers, Frankie (Frankie Pozos) and Gio (Aaron Guerrero), under the guidance of their Mob Boss Mr. Kinski (Mel Novak), have an hour to kill before their next hit. To help pass the time, they entertain themselves by telling horror stories to one another. The story segments are Valkyrie's Bunker, Assacre and Hog Hunters.

Cast
Mel Novak as Mr. Kinski
Aaron Guerrero as Gio
Frankie Pozos as Frankie
Amanda Rau as Jenna
Veronica Ricci as Petunia
Joe McQueen as Lenny
Brendan Mitchell as Brendan
Gabriel Mercado as Gabe

Awards
The film won best director, Horror Action Comedy for Aaron K. Carter and best actor for Mel Novak at the 2019 Los Angeles Nollywood Awards.

References

External links
 
An Hour To Kill: Movie Trailer on YouTube

2018 films
2018 horror films
American comedy horror films
American horror anthology films
2010s American films